The Trumpchi GA6 is a mid-size sedan produced by GAC Group under the Trumpchi brand in China starting from 2014, and under the GAC Motor brand globally.

First generation (2014)

The first generation Trumpchi GA6 originally debuted as a concept on the 2014 Beijing Auto Show in the beginning of 2014, and the production version debuted during the 2014 Guangzhou Auto Show by the end of 2014. 

At the time, it was the largest sedan produced by GAC. Later in 2015, a concept called the Trumpchi GA6 Limited debuted on the 2015 Detroit Auto Show. The Trumpchi GA6 Limited, also called the Trumpchi GA6 GT, is a concept previewing a possible sporty variant of the Trumpchi GA6 produced by Guangzhou Automobile. Pricing of the GA6 ranges from 116,800 yuan to 196,800 yuan.

Second generation (2019)

The second generation Trumpchi GA6 debuted during the 2019 Shanghai Auto Show in April 2019. The second generation GA6 features the new "Light Sculpture" design language of Trumpchi with the lamps implemented into the front grilles to form the new family front fascia, and full width connected tail lamps are implemented in the rear.

See also
 List of GAC vehicles

References

External links

 
 (Global)

2010s cars
GA6
Cars introduced in 2014
mid-size cars
Cars of China
Front-wheel-drive vehicles